Cruttwell is a surname, and may refer to:

 Clement Cruttwell (1743–1808), English mapmaker
 C. R. M. F. Cruttwell, a British historian and academic who served as dean and later principal of Hertford College, Oxford.
 Greg Cruttwell, English actor, son of Hugh Cruttwell
 Hugh Cruttwell, English teacher of drama
 Maud Cruttwell (1859-1939), English artist, art historian, writer 
 Patrick Cruttwell, literary scholar